Cristopher Alexis Sánchez (born December 12, 1996) is a Dominican professional baseball pitcher for the Philadelphia Phillies of Major League Baseball (MLB).

Career

Tampa Bay Rays
Sánchez signed with the Tampa Bay Rays as an international free agent on July 15, 2013 for a $65,000 signing bonus. He spent the 2014, 2015, and 2016 seasons with the DSL Rays. Sánchez went 1–3 with a 7.77 ERA over 22 innings in 2014, 2–1 with a 3.54 ERA over  innings in 2015, and 5–3 with a 3.06 ERA over  innings in 2016. He spent the 2017 season with the Princeton Rays, going 1–6 with a 10.01 ERA over  innings. Sánchez split the 2018 season between Princeton and the Hudson Valley Renegades, going a combined 4–2 with a 4.50 ERA over 52 innings. He split the 2019 season between the Bowling Green Hot Rods, Charlotte Stone Crabs, and Durham Bulls, going 4–1 with a 2.26 ERA over  innings. Sánchez played for the Dominican Republic national baseball team in the 2019 WBSC Premier12.

Philadelphia Phillies
Sánchez was traded to the Philadelphia Phillies in exchange for Curtis Mead on November 20, 2019. Sánchez was added to the Phillies’ 40–man roster after being acquired. He did not play in a game in 2020 due to the cancellation of the Minor League Baseball season because of the COVID-19 pandemic. On April 19, 2021, Sánchez was promoted to the major leagues for the first time. However he was optioned down to the minors the next day without making an MLB appearance. On May 3, Sánchez was recalled to the active roster, but was again optioned down the next day without playing.

After long relievers Chase Anderson and David Hale were placed on the COVID list, leaving the Phillies' bullpen challenged for depth, Sánchez was recalled to the major leagues on June 6, 2021. He made his major league debut the same day, allowing one hit and striking out two batters in the final  innings of a 12–6 win against the Washington Nationals.

References

External links

1996 births
Living people
Bowling Green Hot Rods players
Charlotte Stone Crabs players
Dominican Republic expatriate baseball players in the United States
Dominican Republic national baseball team players
Dominican Summer League Rays players
Durham Bulls players
Hudson Valley Renegades players
Lehigh Valley IronPigs players
Major League Baseball pitchers
Major League Baseball players from the Dominican Republic
People from La Romana, Dominican Republic
Perth Heat players
Philadelphia Phillies players
Princeton Rays players
Toros del Este players
2019 WBSC Premier12 players
Dominican Republic expatriate baseball players in Australia